Batticaloa Tamil could mean 

Batticaloa Tamil person of Batticaloa, in Sri Lanka origin
Batticaloa Tamil dialect used by a person of Batticaloa origin